Adventures of Sherlock Holmes; or, Held for Ransom is a 1905 American silent film directed by J. Stuart Blackton for Vitagraph Studios. It was the second film based on Arthur Conan Doyle's Sherlock Holmes stories, following the 1900 Mutoscope trick film Sherlock Holmes Baffled, and is usually regarded as the first attempt to film a "serious" Holmes adaptation. The scenario was by Theodore Liebler based on elements of Conan Doyle's 1890 novel The Sign of the Four.

Robert Pohle notes that "Deprived of his voice in those early silent films, Holmes was also transformed from an intellectual, armchair detective into a more kinetic action figure—almost a sort of cowboy-in-deerstalker."

Although sometimes considered a lost film, fragments are still extant in the Library of Congress paper print collection. The film was shot on 35mm black-and-white film, running to one reel of 725 feet in length.

Cast
The film was released on October 7, 1905, with H. Kyrle Bellew and J. Barney Sherry in unlisted roles. It was long believed that the film starred Maurice Costello as Sherlock Holmes, but Leslie S. Klinger has written that the identification of Costello in the role is flawed. Klinger states that the first identification of Costello with the role was in Michael Pointer's Public Life of Sherlock Holmes published in 1975 but Pointer later realized his error and wrote to Klinger stating

References

External links

1905 films
American silent short films
American black-and-white films
Films directed by J. Stuart Blackton
Sherlock Holmes films
Lost American films
Vitagraph Studios short films
1900s crime films
American crime films
1900s lost films
1900s American films
Silent mystery films
Silent thriller films